Rutidosis is a genus of Australian annual and perennial herbs in the tribe Gnaphalieae within the family Asteraceae.
 
 Species

 formerly included
see Phacellothrix Podolepis Siloxerus 
 Rutidosis arachnoidea Hook. - Podolepis arachnoidea (Hook.) Druce
 Rutidosis brownii Benth. - Phacellothrix cladochaeta (F.Muell.) F.Muell.
 Rutidosis multiflora (Nees) B.L.Rob. - Siloxerus multiflorus (Nees) Nees
 Rutidosis pumilo Benth. - Siloxerus multiflorus (Nees) Nees

References

External links
 Atlas of Living Australia, Rutidosis DC.
 National recovery plan for button wrinklewort
 New South Wales Government, Rutidosis leiolepis - vulnerable species listing

Asterales of Australia
Gnaphalieae
Asteraceae genera